Padern (Languedocien: Padèrn) is a commune in the Aude department in southern France.

Population

Monuments
The Château de Padern is a ruined castle that stands on a hill overlooking the village.

See also
 Corbières AOC
 Communes of the Aude department

References

Communes of Aude
Aude communes articles needing translation from French Wikipedia